Kenneth Hodgson (19 January 1942 – 23 October 2007), born in Newcastle upon Tyne, England, was an English professional footballer who played as a forward. He played for his  hometown team  Newcastle United, who developed him in their junior and reserve teams. He made six appearances before moving on to Scunthorpe, Bournemouth and Colchester United.

Hodgson was a versatile player, and he played in all five forward positions.

References

External links
 
 Ken Hodgson at Colchester United Archive Database

1942 births
2007 deaths
English footballers
Association football forwards
Footballers from Newcastle upon Tyne
Newcastle United F.C. players
Colchester United F.C. players
Scunthorpe United F.C. players
AFC Bournemouth players
Poole Town F.C. players